New German School of Alexandria (NDSA) is a German international school in Alexandria, Egypt. It operates preschool through high school.

It is recognised as a German school abroad by the Central Agency for German Schools Abroad (ZfA).

2006 is its year of establishment.

References

External links
 New German School of Alexandria
 New German School of Alexandria 

German international schools in Egypt
International schools in Alexandria
2006 establishments in Egypt
Educational institutions established in 2006